Édith et Marcel is a 1983 French film directed by Claude Lelouch.

Plot
In 1947, the singer Édith Piaf and the boxer Marcel Cerdan are both at the peak of their respective careers. Their encounter gives birth to a passionate love affair lasting some two years, cut short by Cerdan's death in an air crash.

Technical details
Title: Édith et Marcel
Director: Claude Lelouch
Music: Francis Lai
Length: 140 minutes
Release date: 13 April 1983

Cast
 Évelyne Bouix : Édith Piaf / Margot de Villedieu
 Jacques Villeret : Jacques Barbier
 Francis Huster : Francis Roman
 Jean-Claude Brialy : Loulou Barbier
 Jean Bouise : Lucien Roupp
Marcel Cerdan Jr : Marcel Cerdan
Charles Gérard : Charlot
Charlotte de Turckheim : Ginou Richet
Micky Sébastian : Marinette Cerdan
Maurice Garrel : le père de Margot
Ginette Garcin : Guite
Philippe Khorsand : Jo Longman
Jany Castaldi : Momône
Candice Patou : la sœur de Margot
Tanya Lopert : Le professeur d'anglais
Charles Aznavour : himself
Beata Tyszkiewicz
Stéphane Ferrara
Jean-Pierre Bacri
Marc Berman
Michel Aumont

Reception
Edith et Marcel received mixed critical reviews. The film holds a 29% rating on Rotten Tomatoes based on seven reviews.

References

External links
 

1980s romance films
1983 films
Biographical films about musicians
Biographical films about sportspeople
Couples
Cultural depictions of boxers
Cultural depictions of Édith Piaf
Films directed by Claude Lelouch
Films set in 1947
Films set in the 1940s
Films set in France
Films scored by Francis Lai
Films shot in France
1980s French-language films
French romance films
1980s French films